The Australian Film Institute International Award for Excellence in Filmmaking was a special award presented by the Australian Film Institute (AFI) "in recognition of any area of achievement (excluding performance) by an Australian in films produced internationally, recognising the contribution of Australian film and television industry practitioners worldwide." It was handed out at the Australian Film Institute Awards (known commonly as the AFI Awards), which are now the AACTA Awards after the establishment of the Australian Academy of Cinema and Television Arts (AACTA), by the AFI. The award was presented in 2001 as a special achievement award before it was made into a competitive award in 2006, but from 2007-2009 it was only handed out as a career based award "acknowledging the continued contribution of an Australian practitioner to international productions", and not for a particular film.

Winners
In the following table, in 2006 winners are listed first, in boldface and highlighted in gold; those listed below the winner that are not in boldface or highlighted are the nominees; in 2005, and from 2007-2009, the award was presented as a special award and those winners will be marked in a different colour. The third column lists the country that the film was made for, from 2005-2007.

See also
AACTA Awards

References

External links
The Australian Academy of Cinema and Television Arts Official website

Awards established in 2005
I